Houari Boumédienne is a district in the Guelma Province of Algeria. It was named after former President of Algeria, Houari Boumédienne.

Municipalities
The district is further divided into 4 municipalities, which is the highest number in the province:
Houari Boumediènne
 Medjez Amar
 Ras El Agba 
 Salaoua Announa

References 

Houari Boumediene District
Districts of Guelma Province